Sharifabad-e Gavkhuni (also Romanized as Sharīfābād-e Gāvkhūnī; also known as Sharīfābād) is a village in Jafarabad Rural District, Jafarabad District, Qom County, Qom Province, Iran. At the 2006 census, its population was 56, in 13 families.

References 

Populated places in Qom Province